Bjørnskinn is a village in Andøy Municipality in Nordland county, Norway. The village is the site of Bjørnskinn Church which serves the southern part of the municipality. The village was also the administrative centre of the old municipality of Bjørnskinn which existed from 1924 until its dissolution in 1964.

Notable residents
Notable people that were born or lived in Bjørnskinn include:
Helmer Hanssen (1870–1956), Polar explorer who was on the expedition of Roald Amundsen to the South Pole 
Johan Kleppe,  member of Norwegian Parliament from Nordland (1969–1973) and defense minister in Korvald's Cabinet (1972–1973)
Finn Myrvang (born 1937), historian
Augustinus Johannessøn Sellevold (1803–1893), fisherman-farmer who was twice elected as member of the Norwegian Parliament from Nordland (1845–1848)

References

External links
Picture portfolio of Bjørnskinn

Villages in Nordland
Andøy